Jane Bunn (born 2 August 1979) is an Australian meteorologist and weather presenter.

Bunn is the weather presenter on Seven News Melbourne.

Career
Bunn completed a Bachelor of Science at Monash University in 2005, where she had majors in Atmospheric Science and Mathematics. In 2006, Jane was selected to undertake a Graduate Diploma of Meteorology provided by the Bureau of Meteorology. After completing her degree she was posted to work as a weather forecaster in Sydney, then Canberra and finally at RAAF's Williamtown base. She has also completed a Graduate Certificate in Journalism from Charles Sturt University. 

In 2008, Bunn made the move to television taking up a role as morning meteorologist at The Weather Channel. In June 2009 she was appointed as weather presenter on WIN News Victoria, where she garnered a loyal following – particularly with farmers reliant on her bulletins.

In June 2014, Bunn resigned from WIN News Victoria after five years to work on a new project; she was replaced by Britt Ditterich. After leaving WIN News she became a fill in weather presenter on ABC News Breakfast and ABC News Victoria.

In November 2014, the Seven Network announced that Bunn would be joining the Seven News Melbourne team replacing Jo Silvagni. Jane began her new role in December.

Bunn has also been a weather contributor on Today and 3AW covering severe weather events, including the Queensland floods and Victoria's Black Saturday bush fires.

Personal life
In 2006, Bunn married Michael, an IT consultant, and the couple live in Melbourne.

Jane grew up in Melbourne's bayside suburbs and attended Firbank Grammar School during her high school years.

She supports St Kilda Football Club in the Australian Football League.

References

External links
Jane's Weather (personal website)

1978 births
Living people
Seven News presenters
Australian meteorologists
Monash University alumni
Australian women television journalists
People from Ballarat
People educated at Firbank Girls' Grammar School
WIN News presenters